The following highways are numbered 9W:

United States
 U.S. Route 9W
 
New York State Route 9W (1927–1930)

See also
 List of highways numbered 9